Lee Won-young (Hangul: 이원영; born 13 March 1981) is a South Korea footballer who plays for  K4 League side Goyang KH. In 2013, he was renamed from Lee Jung-ho to Lee Won-young.

He has played for formerly Pohang Steelers, Jeonbuk Hyundai Motors, Jeju United, Saudi Arabia side Al-Ittifaq and Thai team Pattaya United.

Club career statistics (Busan IPark)
As of 5 November 2016

External links 
 
 
 Lee Jung-Ho statistics in Saudi Arabia

1981 births
Living people
Association football defenders
South Korean footballers
South Korean expatriate footballers
Pohang Steelers players
Jeonbuk Hyundai Motors players
Jeju United FC players
Busan IPark players
Ettifaq FC players
Lee Won-young
K League 1 players
South Korean expatriate sportspeople in Saudi Arabia
Expatriate footballers in Saudi Arabia
South Korean expatriate sportspeople in Thailand
Expatriate footballers in Thailand
Saudi Professional League players